Navajo Butte is a sandstone butte which displays large-scale cross bedding, rising from the south-central part of Table Mountain, Royal Society Range, in Victoria Land. Named by Alan Sherwood, New Zealand Geological Survey party leader in the area, 1987–88, after the famous Navajo sandstone of Utah.

Buttes of Antarctica
Landforms of Victoria Land
Scott Coast